Executive Order 13995, officially titled Ensuring an Equitable Pandemic Response and Recovery, was signed on January 21, 2021 and is the eleventh executive order signed by U.S. President Joe Biden. The order works to guarantee a fair response and recovery from the COVID-19 pandemic.

Provisions 
This order creates the COVID-19 Health Equity Task Force within the Department of Health and Human Services. The task force aims at addressing the pandemic's disproportionate and severe impact on people of color and other under-served populations. The task group should give the President specific suggestions on how to reduce the health inequalities that COVID-19 causes or exacerbates, including how state and municipal officials allocate equitable resources and resources and communicate with communities with colors and underserved peoples. In addition, the task force will work with heads of key agencies to collect data to prepare long-term recommendations to remedy deficiencies.

Effects 
The order will establish a COVID-19 Health Equity Task Force within the United States Department of Health and Human Services. This will benefit communities of color and underserved populations because the government will now be making a more concerted effort to ensure that all people have the same resources and are treated equally.

See also 
 List of executive actions by Joe Biden
2020 United States census

References

External links 
 US Presidential Actions
 Federal Register
Executive Order on Ensuring a Lawful and Accurate Enumeration and Apportionment Pursuant to the Decennial Census

2021 in American law
Executive orders of Joe Biden
January 2021 events in the United States